Jan Zawada (born 6 June 1988 is a Czech football player who currently plays for FC Baník Ostrava.

External links

1988 births
Living people
Czech footballers
Czech First League players
FC Baník Ostrava players
FK Viktoria Žižkov players
Association football defenders